Reidun Andersson (26 June 1922 – 25 January 1992) was a Norwegian politician for the Socialist Left Party.

She served as a deputy representative to the Norwegian Parliament from Nordland during the terms 1981–1985.

References

1922 births
1992 deaths
Socialist Left Party (Norway) politicians
Deputy members of the Storting
Nordland politicians
Norwegian people of Swedish descent